The 1997 NCAA Division I Outdoor Track and Field Championships were contested June 4−7 at Billy Hayes Track at Indiana University in Bloomington, Indiana in order to determine the individual and team national champions of men's and women's collegiate Division I outdoor track and field events in the United States. 

These were the 75th annual men's championships and the 16th annual women's championships. This was the Hoosiers' third time hosting the event (and second time hosting in Bloomington−the 1986 event was in Indianapolis) and first since 1986.

In a repeat of the previous five years' results, Arkansas and LSU topped the men's and women's team standings, respectively; it was the Razorbacks' seventh men's team title and the eleventh for the Lady Tigers (who finished just one point ahead of Texas). 

This was the sixth of eight consecutive titles for Arkansas. The Lady Tigers, meanwhile, captured their eleventh consecutive title, and, ultimately, the last of the eleven straight titles they claimed between 1987 and 1997.

Team results 
 Note: Top 10 only
 (H) = Hosts
Full results

Men's standings

Women's standings

References

NCAA Men's Outdoor Track and Field Championship
NCAA Division I Outdoor Track and Field Championships
NCAA
NCAA Division I Outdoor Track and Field Championships
Track and field in Indiana
NCAA Women's Outdoor Track and Field Championship